Nudaria unifascia is a moth of the subfamily Arctiinae first described by Hiroshi Inoue in 1980. It is found in Japan.

References

Nudariina